is a Japanese voice actor affiliated with Rush Style. His hometown is in Osaka.

Career 
In 2017, he graduated from Osaka Amusement Media Vocational School and signed to Rush Style. Shortly after joining the company, he auditioned for the new rap battle project, Hypnosis Mic, and was cast as Dice Arisugawa.

At the 13th Seiyu Awards in 2019, as part of the Hypnosis Mic cast, he accepted the singing award.

Filmography

TV Anime 
2017
 My First Girlfriend Is a Gal (Mob B Man)

2018

 Fate/Extra Last Encore (male master)
 Devils' Line (suspect)
 Calgula (Tatsuo Takatsu, D follower, male store clerk)
 Dropkick on My Devil (Ichiro)
 Lord of Vermilion: The Crimson King
 SSSS.Gridman
 Goblin Slayer (adventurer, new magician)
 Voice of Fox (man in sunglasses)

2020
 Hypnosis Mic: Division Rap Battle - Rhyme Anima (Dice Arisugawa)

2021
 Tokyo Revengers (Ryōhei Hayashi)
 Record of Ragnarok (Heimdall)

2022
 Tribe Nine (Kiyoshiro Haneda)
 Salaryman's Club (Ryo Natsuki)

Animated films
A Turtle's Shell Is a Human's Ribs (2022), Rintarō

Games 
 Usotsuki Shangri-la (2017）
 God of Dice (2017), Grey, Howl, Dream Man
 Monster Strike (2018)
 Namuamida Butsu! - Rendai UTENA  (2018)
 Cardfight!! Vanguard (2019), Izuru Shidou
 Hypnosis Mic -Alternative Rap Battle (2019), Dice Arisugawa
 Crash Fever (Taishang Laojun/Fenghou) (2021)
 Fuga: Melodies of Steel 2 (2023), Jin Macchiato

Drama CD 

Hypnosis Mic: Division Rap Battle (2017), Dice Arisugawa

Dubbing

Live-action 
Find Me in Paris, Henri Duquet (Christy O'Donnell)
Forbidden Games (New Era Movies edition), Georges Dollé (Jacques Marin)
Snake Eyes, Hard Master (Iko Uwais)
Superman & Lois, Jonathan Kent (Jordan Elsass)
Whitney Houston: I Wanna Dance with Somebody, Bobby Brown (Ashton Sanders)

Animation 
Bad Cat, Rıfkı

Discography

Character Song

Published material

Photo collection 

 Nozuyama Yukihiro 1st Photobook "Meccha Nozuyanen"(野津山幸宏 1stフォトブック「めっちゃのづやねん。」（2019年4月10日、一迅社）

References

External links 
 

Living people
1996 births
People from Osaka Prefecture
Japanese male voice actors